Urbańczyk is a Polish patronymic surname derived from the given name Urban. Notable people with the surname include:

 Aleksandra Urbańczyk (born 1987), Polish swimmer
 Elżbieta Urbańczyk (born 1971), Polish sprint canoeist
 Klaus Urbanczyk (born 1940), East German footballer and manager
 Maciej Urbańczyk (born 1996), Polish footballer
 Przemysław Urbańczyk (born 1951), Polish archaeologist
 Stanisław Urbańczyk (1909–2001), Polish linguist and academic
 Michał Urbańczyk polish singer and keyboarder of Vadis band 

Polish-language surnames
Patronymic surnames